Hernán Ramos Muñoz (born 29 April 1929) is a Chilean basketball player. He competed in the men's tournament at the 1952 Summer Olympics.

References

External links

1929 births
Possibly living people
Chilean men's basketball players
Olympic basketball players of Chile
Basketball players at the 1952 Summer Olympics
Place of birth missing (living people)
1950 FIBA World Championship players